The 1976 United States presidential election in Vermont took place on November 2, 1976, as part of the 1976 United States presidential election which was held throughout all 50 states and the District of Columbia. Voters chose three representatives, or electors to the Electoral College, who voted for president and vice president.

Vermont voted for incumbent Republican President Gerald Ford of Michigan and his running mate Senator Bob Dole of Kansas, defeating Democratic Governor Jimmy Carter of Georgia and his running mate Senator Walter Mondale of Minnesota. Vermont was the only state in the nation in 1976 in which every county or county-equivalent voted for Ford, despite Vermont only being Ford's 8th strongest state in the nation in terms of percentage of the vote.

Ford took 54.34% of the vote to Carter’s 43.14%, a victory margin of 11.20%. Anti-war former Democratic Senator Eugene McCarthy of Minnesota, running as an Independent presidential candidate, came in a distant third, with 2.13%. This is the most recent election in which Vermont backed a losing Republican candidate. Carter is also the last Democrat to win the presidency without carrying Vermont, This is also the most recent election in which Vermont had backed up the losing candidate who previously became president.

Primaries
Presidential primaries were held in the state on March 2, 1976 for the Democratic, Republican and Liberty Union parties.

Democratic primary
Jimmy Carter won the state's non-binding primary against three other candidates. Delegates were later pledged at the party's state convention on May 22.

Republican primary
Gerald Ford won the primary by a large margin and earned a majority of the state's delegates.

Liberty Union primary

Results

Results by county

Analysis
Vermont historically was a bastion of liberal Northeastern Republicanism, and by 1976 the Green Mountain State had gone Republican in every presidential election since the founding of the Republican Party, except in the Democratic landslide of 1964, when the GOP had nominated staunch conservative Barry Goldwater. Gerald Ford, a moderate Northern Republican from Michigan, was easily able to continue the Republican tradition in Vermont, carrying the state comfortably and sweeping every county in the state against Southerner Jimmy Carter. This was the first election since 1892 when Grand Isle County had backed a losing candidate. In addition, this was also the most recent presidential election until 2020 when sparsely populated Essex County did not vote for/back the overall winning candidate.

As the Republican Party would lurch to the right with Ronald Reagan four years later in 1980, Vermont would prove to be the only state in the nation where the moderate Ford would outperform the conservative Reagan. Ford won the state by a larger margin and won more counties than Reagan, reflecting the process of realignment going on at the time both within the party and within the state.

1976 was the last time that a losing Republican candidate would carry the state of Vermont, and the last time that the state would vote Republican in a close election. It was also the last election in which Vermont was more Republican than the nation as a whole, with Ford winning the state by over 11 points despite losing the national race by 2, making Vermont 13% more Republican than the national average in the 1976 election. Vermont would vote more Democratic than the nation in every election that has followed beginning in 1980.

See also
 United States presidential elections in Vermont

References

Vermont
1976
1976 Vermont elections